Chase is an American police procedural drama television series created by Jennifer Johnson for NBC. The series follows a U.S. Marshals fugitive-apprehension team, based out of Houston, Texas. Jerry Bruckheimer and Johnson serve as executive producers for the one-hour drama. The series originally aired on Mondays at 10:00 pm ET/9:00 pm CT and premiered on September 20, 2010.  After the mid-season break, Chase returned on Wednesdays at 9:00 pm ET/8:00 pm CT. On October 19, 2010, the network ordered a full season consisting of 22 episodes, but this order was cut to 18 in December. On February 3, 2011, the show was put on "a hiatus" with no plan regarding the remaining episodes. On April 6, 2011, NBC announced the remaining five episodes would be broadcast on Saturday nights beginning on April 23 and ended the series on May 21, 2011. Later the show was replaced by Harry's Law.

In the United Kingdom, Chase was re-titled Jerry Bruckheimer's Chase and, as of July 2010, was expected to debut on Living TV in 2011.

Premise
Chase revolves around Kelli Giddish's character, U.S. Deputy Marshal Annie Frost. The other principal cast members, who all portray Marshals, are Cole Hauser as Jimmy Godfrey, Amaury Nolasco as Marco Martinez, Rose Rollins as Daisy Ogbaa, and Jesse Metcalfe as Luke Watson. Siena Goines has a recurring role as Jimmy's girlfriend Natalie.

Cast

Main
Kelli Giddish as Annie Nolan Frost
Cole Hauser as Jimmy Godfrey
Amaury Nolasco as Marco Martinez
Rose Rollins as Daisy Ogbaa (episodes 1–16)
Jesse Metcalfe as Luke Watson

Guests
Travis Fimmel as Mason Boyle
Eddie Cibrian as Ben Crowley
Siena Goines as Natalie
Mo Gallini as Hector Torres

Episodes

Development and production
NBC picked up the script penned by Jennifer Johnson with a put pilot commitment in September 2009. Johnson will serve as an executive producer, along with Jerry Bruckheimer and Jonathan Littman. David Nutter was signed to direct the pilot.

Casting announcements began the second week of February 2010. Rose Rollins was first to be cast, in the role of Daisy Ogbaa, the team's weapon specialist. This was followed quickly by the announcements of the casting of Jesse Metcalfe as Luke Watson, a Marshal from Washington, D.C., and Cole Hauser, as an experienced ex-cop who co-heads the apprehension team.  Amaury Nolasco came on board a few days later to portray veteran cop Marco Martinez.

The role of the show's central character, Annie Frost, was offered to actresses Maria Bello, Téa Leoni, and Christina Applegate. The producers were seeking a "strong female lead actress" for the role of Frost. Eventually Kelli Giddish landed the female lead role in late February. The show is primarily set in Houston, Texas episode 2 onward.

The pilot takes place in Houston, Texas and was shot in Dallas and Anna, Texas in March.  NBC ordered Chase to series on May 10, 2010. The series will continue to be filmed in the Dallas area.

On December 3, 2010 the episode order for Chase was cut from 22 to 18.

Broadcast
Chase premiered on September 20, 2010. On November 15, 2010 it was announced that Chase would be moving to Wednesdays at 9:00 pm Eastern/8:00 pm Central beginning in January. On February 3, 2011 NBC pulled Chase from its schedule to be replaced with Minute to Win It.

On July 26, 2010, Sky Living secured the rights to air Chase in the United Kingdom. The show will be called Jerry Bruckheimer's Chase and it will be broadcast in the UK, and is expected to start airing in August 2011. Chase was simulcast in Canada on Citytv.

Chase was included in the test broadcast of CHASE on BEAM 31 Philippines, aired every Monday at 10 pm. When the channel ceased its operation on October 19, 2012, the series was carried over by its succeeding station Jack City.

For late night filler on Thursday from January 17, 2013, TVNZ began airing this on New Zealand's TV2.

Reception

Critical response

The show has received mixed reviews from critics, gaining a 48 out of 100 from review aggregator site Metacritic.

Ratings

See also 
 FBI: Most Wanted—an American police procedural drama television series which follows an FBI fugitive-apprehension team

References

External links
 
 

2010s American crime drama television series
2010s American police procedural television series
2010 American television series debuts
2011 American television series endings
American action television series
English-language television shows
NBC original programming
Television series by Warner Bros. Television Studios
Television shows filmed in Texas
Television shows set in Houston
United States Marshals Service in fiction